Walter Ocampo (27 December 1928 – 2 September 2007) was a Mexican breaststroke and butterfly swimmer who competed in the 1952 Summer Olympics and in the 1956 Summer Olympics.

References

External links

1928 births
2007 deaths
Swimmers from Mexico City
Mexican male breaststroke swimmers
Mexican male butterfly swimmers
Olympic swimmers of Mexico
Swimmers at the 1952 Summer Olympics
Swimmers at the 1955 Pan American Games
Swimmers at the 1956 Summer Olympics
Pan American Games silver medalists for Mexico
Pan American Games bronze medalists for Mexico
Pan American Games medalists in swimming
Central American and Caribbean Games gold medalists for Mexico
Competitors at the 1954 Central American and Caribbean Games
Central American and Caribbean Games medalists in swimming
Medalists at the 1955 Pan American Games
20th-century Mexican people
21st-century Mexican people